Gaspar de Baeza (Baeza, 1540–1569) was a Spanish humanist, lawyer, translator and writer known during the Spanish Golden Age.

He studied law at the University of Granada and University of Salamanca, where he was a pupil of Juan Orozco.

Works 
 In Caroli Quinti... constitutionem de non meliorandi filiabus dotis ratione... enarratio (Granada, 1566).
 De Decima Tutori Hispanico iure praestanda tractatus (Granada, 1567).
 Prima Pars tractatus de Inope debitore (Granada, 1592).
 Opera Omnia Gasparis Beatiae (Madrid, 1592).

1540 births
1569 deaths
Spanish male writers
16th-century Latin-language writers
University of Granada alumni
University of Salamanca alumni